Morbier is a semi-soft cows' milk cheese of France named after the small village of Morbier in Franche-Comté. It is ivory colored, soft and slightly elastic, and is immediately recognizable by the distinctive thin black layer separating it horizontally in the middle. It has a yellowish, sticky rind.

Description

The aroma of Morbier cheese is mild, with a rich and creamy flavour.   It has a semblance to Raclette cheese in consistency.

The Jura and Doubs versions both benefit from an appellation d'origine protegée (AOP), though other non-AOP Morbier exist on the market.

Preparation
Traditionally, the cheese consists of a layer of evening milk curd and a layer of morning milk curd. When making Comté, cheesemakers would end the day with leftover curd that was not enough for an entire cheese. Thus, they would press the remaining evening curd into a mold, and spread ash over it to protect it overnight. The following morning, the cheese would be topped with morning milk curd. The layer of ash is left in place in between the layers of milk.

Today, it is typically prepared in factories and larger dairy cooperatives from one batch of milk, with the traditional ash line replaced by edible commercial vegetable ash.

See also
List of French cheeses
List of cheeses

References

Further reading

 

French cheeses
French products with protected designation of origin
Cow's-milk cheeses